2752 Wu Chien-Shiung, provisional designation , is an Eoan asteroid from the outer regions of the asteroid belt, approximately  in diameter. It was discovered on 20 September 1965, by astronomers at Purple Mountain Observatory in Nanking, China. The asteroid has a long rotation period of 36.3 hours. It was named for Chinese-American nuclear physicist Chien-Shiung Wu.

Orbit and classification 

Wu Chien-Shiung is a core member of the Eos family, one of the largest asteroid families named after 221 Eos. It orbits the Sun in the outer main-belt at a distance of 2.7–3.4 AU once every 5 years and 3 months (1,920 days; semi-major axis of 3.02 AU). Its orbit has an eccentricity of 0.11 and an inclination of 10° with respect to the ecliptic.

Physical characteristics 

Wu Chien-Shiung is an assumed S-type asteroid, while the overall spectral type for members of the Eos family is that of a K-type.

Rotation period 

In August 2012, a rotational lightcurve of Wu Chien-Shiung was obtained from photometric observations in the S-band by astronomers with the Palomar Transient Factory in California. Lightcurve analysis gave a long rotation period of 36.343 hours with a brightness amplitude of 0.28 magnitude. While not being a slow rotator with spin rates above 100 hours, Wu Chien-Shiung period is significantly longer than the average 2 to 20 hours observed for most asteroids.

Diameter and albedo 

According to the surveys carried out by the Japanese Akari satellite and the NEOWISE mission of NASA's Wide-field Infrared Survey Explorer, Wu Chien-Shiung measures 15.484 and 16.65 kilometers in diameter and its surface has an albedo of 0.203 and 0.184, respectively, while the Collaborative Asteroid Lightcurve Link assumes a standard albedo for K-type asteroids of 0.14 – derived from the Eos family's parent body – and calculates a diameter of 17.80 kilometers based on an absolute magnitude of 11.5.

Naming 

This minor planet was named after Chinese-American nuclear physicist Chien-Shiung Wu (1912–1997), renowned for her research on the separation of uranium isotopes by gaseous diffusion and for the Wu experiment conducted in 1956, for which she was awarded a Wolf Prize in Physics in 1978 (also see list of laureates).

The official naming citation was published by the Minor Planet Center on 11 March 1990.

References

External links 
 Asteroid Lightcurve Database (LCDB), query form (info )
 Dictionary of Minor Planet Names, Google books
 Asteroids and comets rotation curves, CdR – Observatoire de Genève, Raoul Behrend
 Discovery Circumstances: Numbered Minor Planets (1)-(5000) – Minor Planet Center
 
 

002752
002752
Named minor planets
19650920